Infofree.com is a subscription-based, software as a service system company based in Omaha, Nebraska that provides sales leads, email lists and CRM to businesses. The company also offers a mobile application with mapping features. The company was founded in 2011 by Vinod Gupta, who was also the founder of Salesgenie, InfoUSA and Infogroup. It appeared in a top 500 list of fastest-growing companies in 2013. Robert Smith is the president of Infofree.com. Infofree.com is based in San Mateo, California and is headquartered at Omaha, Nebraska.

Business model 
Infofree is a provider of mailing, telemarketing, and email lists.  They offer basic marketing software such as a CRM and mobile sales app.

Recognition 
Inc. 500 listed Infofree.com among the top 500 fastest growing companies in 2013.

References

External links 
 Official website

Companies based in Omaha, Nebraska
Privately held companies based in Nebraska
American companies established in 2011
Software companies established in 2011
2011 establishments in Nebraska